Carl Rosenlund Nielsen (5 January 1930 – 29 June 1991) was a Danish rower. He competed at the 1952 Summer Olympics in Helsinki with the men's coxless four where they were eliminated in the round one repêchage.

References

1930 births
1991 deaths 
Danish male rowers
Olympic rowers of Denmark
Rowers at the 1952 Summer Olympics
Sportspeople from Aarhus
European Rowing Championships medalists